Pages Related to Stellar properties, Pages using the word stellar in a physics context.

 Stellar aberration
 Stellar aberration (derivation from Lorentz transformation)
 Stellar age estimation
 Stellar archaeology
 Stellar astronomy
 Stellar atmosphere
 Stellar birthline
 Stellar black hole
 Stellar cartography
 Stellar chemistry
 Stellar chonography
 Stellar classification
 Stellar cluster
 Stellar collision
 Stellar core
 Stellar coronae
 Stellar density
 Stellar disk
 Stellar distance
 Stellar drift
 Stellar dynamics
 Stellar engine
 Stellar engineering
 Stellar envelope see stellar atmosphere
 Stellar evolution
 Stellar flare
 Stellar flux
 Stellar fog
 Stellar halo
 Stellar interferometer
 Stellar isochrone
 Stellar kinematics
 Stellar limb-darkening
 Stellar luminosity
 Stellar magnetic field
 Stellar magnitude
 Stellar mass
 Stellar mass black hole
 Stellar mass loss
 Stellar molecule
 Stellar navigation
 Stellar near-collision
 Stellar neighborhood
 Stellar nucleosynthesis
 Stellar nursery
 Stellar occultation
 Stellar parallax
 Stellar physics
 Stellar planetary
 Stellar population
 Stellar precession
 Stellar pulsations
 Stellar quake
 Stellar radius
 Stellar remnant
 Stellar rotation
 Stellar scintillation
 Stellar seismology
 Stellar spectra
 Stellar spheroid
 Stellar spin-down
 Stellar structure
 Stellar surface fusion
 Stellar system
 Stellar triangulation
 Stellar uplift
 Stellar variation
 Stellar vault
 Stellar wind
 Stellar wind (disambiguation)
 Stellar wobble
 Stellar X-ray astronomy
 Stellar-wind bubble
 Other
 Catalog of Stellar Identifications
 Fossil stellar magnetic field
 General Catalogue of Stellar Radial Velocities
 General Catalogue of Trigonometric Stellar Parallaxes
 Interstellar cloud
 Inter-stellar clouds
 Interstellar medium
 List of stellar angular diameters
 List of stellar streams
 Low-dimensional chaos in stellar pulsations
 Mark III Stellar Interferometer
 Michelson stellar interferometer
 NEMO (Stellar Dynamics Toolbox)
 Non-stellar astronomical object
 Quasi-stellar object
 Substellar object
 Sub-stellar object
 Sydney University Stellar Interferometer
 TD1 Catalog of Stellar Ultraviolet Fluxes
 Timeline of stellar astronomy
 Utah state stellar cluster
 Young stellar object

Astronomy-related lists
Properties